This article contains the list of Indonesian animals.

List

See also 
 Fauna of Indonesia
 Endemic birds of Indonesia
 List of Indonesian birds

References

Indonesian endemic animals